Neuromodulation is the physiological process by which a given neuron uses one or more chemicals to regulate diverse populations of neurons. Neuromodulators typically bind to metabotropic, G-protein coupled receptors (GPCRs) to initiate a second messenger signaling cascade that induces a broad, long-lasting signal. This modulation can last for hundreds of milliseconds to several minutes. Some of the effects of neuromodulators include: alter intrinsic firing activity, increase or decrease voltage-dependent currents, alter synaptic efficacy, increase bursting activity and reconfiguration of synaptic connectivity.

Major neuromodulators in the central nervous system include: dopamine, serotonin, acetylcholine, histamine,  norepinephrine, nitric oxide, and several neuropeptides. Cannabinoids can also be powerful CNS neuromodulators.  Neuromodulators can be packaged into vesicles and released by neurons, secreted as hormones and delivered through the circulatory system. A neuromodulator can be conceptualized as a neurotransmitter that is not reabsorbed by the pre-synaptic neuron or broken down into a metabolite. Some neuromodulators end up spending a significant amount of time in the cerebrospinal fluid (CSF), influencing (or "modulating") the activity of several other neurons in the brain.

Neuromodulatory systems

The major neurotransmitter systems are the noradrenaline (norepinephrine) system, the dopamine system, the serotonin system, and the cholinergic system. Drugs targeting the neurotransmitter of such systems affect the whole system, which explains the mode of action of many drugs.

Most other neurotransmitters, on the other hand, e.g. glutamate, GABA and glycine, are used very generally throughout the central nervous system.

Noradrenaline system

The noradrenaline system consists of around 15,000 neurons, primarily in the locus coeruleus. This is diminutive compared to the more than 100 billion neurons in the brain. As with dopaminergic neurons in the substantia nigra,  neurons in the locus coeruleus tend to be melanin-pigmented. Noradrenaline is released from the neurons, and acts on adrenergic receptors. Noradrenaline is often released steadily so that it can prepare the supporting glial cells for calibrated responses. Despite containing a relatively small number of neurons, when activated, the noradrenaline system plays major roles in the brain including involvement in suppression of the neuroinflammatory response, stimulation of neuronal plasticity through LTP, regulation of glutamate uptake by astrocytes and LTD, and consolidation of memory.

Dopamine system

The dopamine or dopaminergic system consists of several pathways, originating from the ventral tegmentum or substantia nigra as examples. It acts on dopamine receptors.

Parkinson's disease is at least in part related to dropping out of dopaminergic cells in deep-brain nuclei, primarily the melanin-pigmented neurons in the substantia nigra but secondarily the noradrenergic neurons of the locus coeruleus. Treatments potentiating the effect of dopamine precursors have been proposed and effected, with moderate success.

Dopamine pharmacology

Cocaine, for example, blocks the reuptake of dopamine, leaving these neurotransmitters in the synaptic gap longer.
AMPT prevents the conversion of tyrosine to L-DOPA, the precursor to dopamine; reserpine prevents dopamine storage within vesicles; and deprenyl inhibits monoamine oxidase (MAO)-B and thus increases dopamine levels.

Serotonin system

The serotonin created by the brain comprises around 10% of total body serotonin. The majority (80-90%) is found in the gastrointestinal (GI) tract. It travels around the brain along the medial forebrain bundle and acts on serotonin receptors. In the peripheral nervous system (such as in the gut wall) serotonin regulates vascular tone.

Serotonin pharmacology

Selective serotonin reuptake inhibitors (SSRIs) such as fluoxetine are widely used antidepressants that specifically block the reuptake of serotonin with less effect on other transmitters.
Tricyclic antidepressants also block reuptake of biogenic amines from the synapse, but may primarily effect serotonin or norepinephrine or both. They typically take 4 to 6 weeks to alleviate any symptoms of depression. They are considered to have immediate and long-term effects.
Monoamine oxidase inhibitors allow reuptake of biogenic amine neurotransmitters from the synapse, but inhibit an enzyme which normally destroys (metabolizes) some of the transmitters after their reuptake. More of the neurotransmitters (especially serotonin, noradrenaline and dopamine) are available for release into synapses. MAOIs take several weeks to alleviate the symptoms of depression.

Although changes in neurochemistry are found immediately after taking these antidepressants, symptoms may not begin to improve until several weeks after administration. Increased transmitter levels in the synapse alone does not relieve the depression or anxiety.

Cholinergic system
The cholinergic system consists of projection neurons from the pedunculopontine nucleus, laterodorsal tegmental nucleus, and basal forebrain and interneurons from the striatum and nucleus accumbens. It is not yet clear whether acetylcholine as a neuromodulator acts through volume transmission or classical synaptic transmission, as there is evidence to support both theories. Acetylcholine binds to both metabotropic muscarinic receptors (mAChR) and the ionotropic nicotinic receptors (nAChR). The cholinergic system has been found to be involved in responding to cues related to the reward pathway, enhancing signal detection and sensory attention, regulating homeostasis, mediating the stress response, and encoding the formation of memories.

GABA
Gamma-aminobutyric acid (GABA) has an inhibitory effect on brain and spinal cord activity.

Neuropeptides
Neuropeptides are small proteins used for communication in the nervous system. Neuropeptides represent the most diverse class of signaling molecules. There are 90 known genes that encode human neuropeptide precursors. In invertebrates, there are ~50 known genes encoding neuropeptide precursors. Most neuropeptides bind to G-protein coupled receptors, however some neuropeptides directly gate ion channels or act through kinase receptors.

Opioid peptides – a large family of endogenous neuropeptides that are widely distributed throughout the central and peripheral nervous system. Opiate drugs such as heroin and morphine act at the receptors of these neurotransmitters.

Endorphins
Enkephalins
Dynorphins

Vasopressin
Oxytocin
Gastrin
Cholecystokinins
Somatostatin
Cortistatins
RF-amides
Neuropeptide FF
Neuropeptide Y -
Pancreatic Polypeptide
Peptide YY
Prolactin-releasing peptide
Calcitonin
Adrenomedullin
Natriuretic
Bombesin-like peptides
Endothelin
Glucagon
Secretin
Vasoactive Intestinal Peptide
Growth Hormone Releasing Hormone
Gastric Inhibitory Peptide
Corticotropin Releasing Hormone
Urocortin
Urotensin
Substance P
Neuromedins
 Tensin
Kinin
Granin
Nerve Growth Factor
Motilin
Ghrelin
Galanin
Neuropeptide B/W
Neurexophilin
Insulin
Relaxin
 Agouti-related protein homolog gene
Prolactin
Apelin
Metastasis-suppressor
Diazepam-binding inhibitor
 Cerebellins
Leptin
Adiponectin
 Visfatin
Resistin
Nucleibindin
Ubiquitin

Neuromuscular systems
Neuromodulators may alter the output of a physiological system by acting on the associated inputs (for instance, central pattern generators).  However, modeling work suggests that this alone is insufficient, because the neuromuscular transformation from neural input to muscular output may be tuned for particular ranges of input. Stern et al. (2007) suggest that neuromodulators must act not only on the input system but must change the transformation itself to produce the proper  contractions of muscles as output.

Volume transmission
Neurotransmitter systems are systems of neurons in the brain expressing certain types of neurotransmitters, and thus form distinct systems. Activation of the system causes effects in large volumes of the brain, called volume transmission. Volume transmission is the diffusion of neurotransmitters through the brain extracellular fluid released at points that may be remote from the target cells with the resulting activation of extrasynaptic receptors, and with a longer time course than for transmission at a single synapse. Such prolonged transmitter action is called tonic transmission, in contrast to the phasic transmission that occurs rapidly at single synapses.

Other uses
Neuromodulation also refers to an emerging class of medical therapies that target the nervous system for restoration of function (such as in cochlear implants), relief of pain, or control of symptoms, such as tremor seen in movement disorders like Parkinson's disease. The therapies consist primarily of targeted electrical stimulation, or infusion of medications into the cerebrospinal fluid using intrathecal drug delivery, such as baclofen for spasticity. Electrical stimulation devices include deep brain stimulation systems (DBS), colloquially referred to as "brain pacemakers", spinal cord stimulators (SCS) and vagus nerve stimulators (VNS), which are implanted using minimally invasive procedures, or transcutaneous electrical nerve stimulation devices, which are fully external, among others.

See also
 5-HT2c receptor agonist
 Natural neuroactive substance

References

External links
North American Neuromodulation Society
Neuromodulation and Neural Plasticity
International Neuromodulation Society
Scolarpedia article on neuromodulation

Neurochemistry
Neurophysiology